Hillcrest is a suburb of Adelaide in the City of Port Adelaide Enfield local government area. It is around 10 km northeast of the city centre.

It was best known as the location of the Hillcrest Hospital, a state government institution for people suffering mental illness that took up most of the suburb's area before the northern part of the suburb was renamed Gilles Plains, but the remainder of this institution and its converted former buildings are now within the suburb of Oakden.

Hillcrest is bounded by the side streets of Lord Howe Avenue, Oxford Street and Bristol Terrace to the north, Blacks Road to the east, North East Road to the South and Fosters Road to the west.

Its housing stock has undergone a radical transformation in recent years from being predominantly weatherboard dwellings on traditional large blocks, with a large percentage of Housing SA owned dwellings, to one containing almost as many smaller houses since a concerted effort to update the housing stock began in 1993 by the Government of South Australia. There is ongoing urban infill occurring in Hillcrest.

The North East Road section of the suburb is almost completely commercial in nature, noted for its large number of motor vehicle dealerships, and is also home to North Adelaide Basketball Club at Hillcrest Stadium and the North East Community Assistance Project which is housed in the heritage listed former Gilles Plains Primary School building.

The suburb is also home to the Aveo Crestview Retirement Village on the former Anchor Foods (not to be confused with the unrelated New Zealand dairy product manufacturer) factory site on Fosters Road which was opened in 1993 when Anchor Foods consolidated their production in Perth, Western Australia.

Its other buildings of note include the Oakden Medical Centre and the Hillcrest Community Centre, which has been operated by the City of Port Adelaide Enfield since 1995, adjacent to the Hillcrest Primary School with whom it originally was a shared project.

Hillcrest is bisected by large linear reserves which are the remnants of the proposed Tea Tree Gully rail line proposed in the 1950s but which never eventuated and was completely abandoned in the late 1970s.

References

Suburbs of Adelaide